Fc receptor-like protein 4 is a protein that in humans is encoded by the FCRL4 gene. FCRL4 is an inhibitory receptor expressed on human memory B cells which resides in epithelial tissues.

References

Further reading

Fc receptors